Chagalamarri is a mandal and a small town in Nandyal district of Andhra Pradesh, India. It comes under Allagadda constituency for state assembly elections and comes under Nandyal constituency for parliament elections. Chagalamarri is an well developing city. There are lot of sites to vist in chagalamarri. The people of Chagalamarri are very kind and humble. Chagalamarri people had a well hospitality habit. There was a lot of farming held in Chagalamarri season by season. Most of the harvesting was paddy and flowers. The youngsters population is more than the Adults in Chagalamarri. The Jama masjid, Noorani masjid, Khilla masjid and many more masjid are in Chagalamarri. The Ayyappa temple, Ammavarishala Ramalayam and many more temples also in Chagalamarri. Not only this there are Mary mata church and many number of  Churches there in Chagalamarri. The people here live together as one in diversity and in kinship with each other.

Geography
It is almost equidistant from Hyderabad, Chennai and Bangalore. It is located at the border of Kurnool and Kadapa districts. The main sources of water for irrigation are the Vakkileru river and Kadapa-Kurnool canal.

Places to visit

References

Cities and towns in Nandyal district
Mandals in Nandyal district